Marie of Artois (French: Marie d'Artois, Dutch: Maria van Artesië.) Born in 1291, was the Margravine consort of Namur in 1310-1330 by marriage to John I, Marquis of Namur. She was the regent of Namur during the minority of her son William I in 1337-1340.

She became the Lady of Méraude (Merode) when she purchased it from John the Blind, King of Bohemia, in 1342, until she left it to her son William I in 1353.

Life
She was the fourth daughter of Philip of Artois and Blanche of Brittany. 

Marie married John I, Marquis of Namur, son of Guy of Dampierre, Count of Flanders and Marquis of Namur, and his second wife Isabelle of Luxembourg. 

They were married by contract in Paris on 6 March 1310, confirmed in Poissy, January 1313. John granted her as dower the castle of Wijnendale in Flanders, ratified by the Count of Flanders (John's half-brother, Robert III) in 1313.

She became a widow in 1330. 

In 1337, her youngest fifth son became Marquis. Since he was fifteen and a minor, she became Regent of Namur until her reached his majority.

Issue

References

Sources

1291 births
1365 deaths
House of Artois
14th-century women rulers